Oligogalacturonate-specific porins (KdgM) are a family of outer bacterial membrane proteins from Dickeya dadantii. The phytopathogenic Gram-negative bacteria D. dadantii secretes pectinases, which are able to degrade the pectic polymers of plant cell walls, and uses the degradation products as a carbon source for growth. Synthesis of KdgM is strongly induced in the presence of pectic derivatives. KdgM behaves like a voltage-dependent porin that is slightly selective for anions and that exhibits fast block in the presence of trigalacturonate. KdgM seems to be monomeric.

References

Outer membrane proteins
Protein families